The 181st Armed Police Mobile Division is a military formation of the People's Armed Police of the People's Republic of China.

The 181st Division was created in January 1949 under the Regulation of the Redesignations of All Organizations and Units of the Army, issued by Central Military Commission on November 1, 1948. The division's predecessor was the Yuxi Anti-Japanese Independence Detachment of the Eighth Route Army, which was formed by the 3rd and 35th Regiments of the Taihang Military Region on September 6, 1944.

In March 1951, the 181st Division transferred to the 60th Corps and served in the Korean War. It returned to China in September 1953. In 1954 it served as an exercise and demonstration formation.

From December 1969 to January 1985, it was numbered the 180th Division. It was transferred to the 1st Army in September 1985, and became part of the People's Armed Police in 1996.

References

Units and formations of the People's Armed Police